Warvillers is a commune in the Somme department in Hauts-de-France in northern France.

Geography
Warvillers is situated 21 miles(33 km) southeast of Amiens, on the D329 road

Population

See also
Communes of the Somme department

References

Communes of Somme (department)